Saprosma is a genus of flowering plants in the family Rubiaceae. There are about 40 species distributed from south China to tropical Asia.

These are shrubs with opposite or whorled leaves and often an offensive scent. The inflorescence is usually a cluster of white flowers. The fleshy fruit is blue to black in color.

Species
, Plants of the World Online accepted the following species:

Saprosma anisophylla Merr.
Saprosma annamensis Pierre ex Pit.
Saprosma arborea Blume
Saprosma axilliflora Valeton
Saprosma beddomei M.Gangop.
Saprosma borneensis Wernham
Saprosma brassii Merr. & L.M.Perry
Saprosma brunnea Craib
Saprosma chevalieri Pit.
Saprosma cochinchinensis Pierre ex Pit.
Saprosma consimilis Kurz
Saprosma corymbosa (Bedd.) Bedd.
Saprosma crassipes H.S.Lo
Saprosma dispar Hassk.
Saprosma distans Craib
Saprosma elegans (Korth.) A.P.Davis
Saprosma foetens (Wight) K.Schum.
Saprosma fragrans (Bedd.) Bedd.
Saprosma fruticosa Blume
Saprosma glomerata (Gardner) Bedd.
Saprosma glomerulata King & Gamble
Saprosma gracilis Pit.
Saprosma hainanensis Merr.
Saprosma henryi Hutch.
Saprosma hirsuta Korth.
Saprosma inaequilonga Pierre ex Pit.
Saprosma kraussii Rech.
Saprosma latifolia Craib
Saprosma longicalyx Craib
Saprosma longifolia Pit.
Saprosma membranacea Merr.
Saprosma parvifolia Craib
Saprosma philippinensis Elmer
Saprosma pubescens Ridl.
Saprosma saxicola Ridl.
Saprosma scabrida (Thwaites) Bedd.
Saprosma scortechinii King & Gamble
Saprosma sogerensis S.Moore
Saprosma spathulata Valeton
Saprosma subrepanda (K.Schum. & Lauterb.) Valeton
Saprosma syzygiifolia Valeton
Saprosma ternata (Wall.) Hook.f.
Saprosma urophylla Merr.
Saprosma verrucosa Pit.

References

External links 
 

 
Rubiaceae genera
Taxonomy articles created by Polbot